This is a list of Taliban leaders during the insurgency from 2001 to 2021.

Supreme leaders

Deputies and ministers

Governors

Other high-ranking officials, ambassadors and envoys abroad

Field commanders

See also
 Quetta Shura

References

Government of Afghanistan